Senator Scammon may refer to:

J. Young Scammon (1812–1890), Illinois State Senate
John Scammon (1865–1940), New Hampshire State Senate
Seth Scamman (1811–1894), Maine State Senate